This is a list of Swedish infantry regiments.

Original regiments 
The original thirteen (fourteen) Swedish county regiments of Foot:

 Dalregementet (Dalarna Regiment)
 Hälsinge regemente (Hälsingland Regiment)
 Jönköpings regemente (Jönköping Regiment)
 Kalmar regemente (Kalmar Regiment)
 Kronobergs regemente (Kronoberg Regiment)
 Närke-Värmlands regemente (Närke-Värmland Regiment)
 Skaraborgs regemente (Skaraborg Regiment)
 Södermanlands regemente (Södermanland Regiment)
 Upplands regemente (Uppland Regiment)
 Västerbottens regemente (Västerbotten Regiment)
 Västgöta-Dals regemente (Västergötland-Dalsland Regiment)
 Västmanlands regemente (Västmanland Regiment)
 Älvsborgs regemente (Älvsborg Regiment)
 Östgöta infanteriregemente (Östergötland Infantry Regiment)

The original seven Finnish provincial infantry regiments:

 Björneborgs läns regemente (Björneborg County Regiment)
 Nylands infanteriregemente (Nyland Regiment of Foot)
 Savolax och Nyslotts läns regemente (Savolax and Nyslott County Regiment)
 Tavastehus läns regemente (Tavastehus County Regiment)
 Viborgs läns infanteriregemente (Viborg County Regiment of Foot)
 Åbo läns infanteriregemente (Åbo County Regiment of Foot)
 Österbottens regemente (Österbotten Regiment)

Later raised Swedish infantry regiments:

 Andra livgrenadjärregementet (2nd Life Grenadier Regiment)
 Bergsregementet (The Mine Regiment)
 Blekinge bataljon (Blekinge Battalion)
 Drottningens livregemente till fot (Queen's Life Regiment of Foot)
 Första livgrenadjärregementet (1st Life Grenadier Regiment)
 Gotlands infanteriregemente (Gotland Infantry Regiment)
 Göta livgarde (Göta Life Guards)
 Jämtlands fältjägarregemente (Jämtland Ranger Regiment)
 Karlskrona grenadjärregemente (Karlskrona Grenadier Regiment)
 Lapplands jägarregemente (Lapland Rifle Regiment)
 Livdrabantkåren (The Gardes du Corps)
 Livgrenadjärregementet (Life Grenadier Regiment)
 Livregementet till fot (Life Regiment of Foot)
 Norra skånska infanteriregementet (North Scanian Infantry Regiment)
 Norra Smålands regemente (Northern Småland Regiment)
 Norrbottens regemente (Norrbotten Regiment)
 Närkes regemente (Närke Regiment)
 Svea livgarde (Svea Life Guards)
 Svenska livregementet till fot (Swedish Life Regiment of Foot)
 Södra skånska infanteriregementet (Southern Scanian Infantry Regiment)
 Vaxholms grenadjärregemente (Vaxholm Grenadier Regiment)
 Värmlands regemente (Värmland Regiment)
 Västernorrlands regemente (Västernorrland Regiment)

Later raised Finnish infantry regiments:

 Finska värvade bataljonen (Finnish Enlisted Battalion)
 Nylands och Tavastehus västra infanteriregemente (Nyland and Tavastia West Infantry Regiment)
 Savolax jägarregemente (Savonia Ranger Regiment)
 Vasa regemente (Vasa Regiment)
 Östra Nylands infanteriregemente (East Nyland Infantry Regiment)

Later raised German infantry regiments:

 Anklamska lantregementet (Anklam County Regiment)
 Bajerska infanteriregementet (Bavarian Infantry Regiment)
 Bremiska infanteriregementet (Bremen Infantry Regiment)
 Bremiska lantregementet (Bremen County Regiment)
 Elbingska garnisonsregementet (Elbing Garrison Regiment)
 Garnisonsregementet i Stade (Garrison Regiment in Stade)
 Garnisonsregementet i Stralsund (Garrison Regiment in Stralsund)
 Garnisonsregementet i Wismar (Garrison Regiment in Wismar)
 Guvernörsregementet i Wismar (Governor's Regiment in Wismar)
 Lantregementet i Stettin (County Regiment in Stettin)
 Pommerska infanteriregementet (Pomeranian Infantry Regiment)
 Rhenländska infanteriregementet (Rhineland Infantry Regiment)
 Riksänkedrottningens livregemente i Pommern (Queen Dowager's Life Guard Regiment in Pomerania)
 Rügenska lantregementet (Rügian County Regiment)
 Sachsiska infanteriregementet (Saxon Infantry Regiment)
 Sachsisk infanteribataljon I (Saxon Infantry Battalion I)
 Sachsisk infanteribataljon II (Saxon Infantry Battalion II)
 Sachsisk infanteribataljon III (Saxon Infantry Battalion III)
 Tyska livregementet till fot (German Foot Life Guard Regiment
 Tysk infanteribataljon (German Infantry Battalion))

Later raised Baltic infantry regiments:

 Estländskt infanteriregemente, Harriska kretsen (Estonian Infantry Regiment, Harrian Circle)
 Estländskt infanteriregemente, Jerwiska kretsen (Estonian Infantry Regiment, Jerwian Circle)
 Estländskt infanteriregemente, Wieriska kretsen I (Estonian Infantry Regiment, Wierian Circle I)
 Estländskt infanteriregemente, Wieriska kretsen II (Estonian Infantry Regiment, Wierian Circle II)
 Estländskt infanteriregemente II (Estonian Infantry Regiment II)
 Garnisonsregementet i Narva (Garrison Regiment in Narva)
 Garnisonsregementet i Riga (Garrison Regiment in Riga)
 Guvenörsregementet i Riga (Governor's Regiment in Riga)
 Ingermanländskt infanteriregemente (Ingrian Infantry Regiment)
 Livländsk infanteribataljon I (Livonian Infantry Battalion I)
 Livländsk infanteribataljon II (Livonian Infantry Battalion II)
 Livländsk infanteribataljon III (Livonian Infantry Battalion III)
 Livländsk infanteribataljon IV (Livonian Infantry Battalion IV)
 Livländskt infanteriregemente I (Livonian Infantry Regiment I)
 Livländskt infanteriregemente II (Livonian Infantry Regiment II)
 Livländskt infanteriregemente III (Livonian Infantry Regiment III)
 Livländskt infanteriregemente IV (Livonian Infantry Regiment IV)
 Livländskt infanteriregemente V (Livonian Infantry Regiment V)
 Stadsmajorens i Reval Bataljon (Reval City Major Battalion)

Other later raised infantry regiments:

 Värvat främlingsregemente (Enlisted Foreigner Regiment)
 Fransk bataljon (French Battalion)
 Schweizisk bataljon (Swiss Battalion)

Later raised Swedish temporary infantry regiments:

 Grenadjärbataljonen (Grenadier Battalion)
 Hallands utskrivningsregemente (Halland Conscript Regiment)
 Hälsinge tremänningsbataljon (Hälsingland Third Man Battalion)
 Närke-Värmlands tremänningsregemente till fot (Närke-Värmland Third Man Foot Regiment)
 Smålands femmänningsregemente till fot (Småland Fifth Man Foot Regiment)
 Smålands tremänningsregemente till fot (Småland Third Man Foot Regiment)
 Upplands femmänningsregemente (Uppland Fifth Man Regiment)
 Upplands tremänningsregemente till fot (Uppland Third Man Foot Regiment)
 Västerbottens tremänningar till fot (Västerbotten Foot Third Men)
 Västgöta femmänningsregemente till fot (Västergötland Fifth Man Foot Regiment)
 Västgöta tremänningsregemente till fot (Västergötland Third Man Foot Regiment)
 Västra skånska utskrivningsregementet (Western Scanian Conscript Regiment)
 Östgöta och Södermanlands tremänningsregemente till fot (Östergötland and Södermanland Third Man Foot Regiment)
 Östra skånska utskrivningsregementet (Eastern Scanian Conscript Regiment)

Later raised Finnish temporary infantry regiments:

 Åbo, Björneborgs och Nylands tremänningsregemente till fot (Åbo, Björneborg and Nyland Third Man Foot Regiment)
 Nylands femmänningar till fot (Nyland Foot Fifth Men)
 Österbottens femmänningar till fot (Österbotten Foot Fifth Men)
 Österbottens tremänningar till fot (Österbotten Foot Third Men)
 Savolax femmänningsregemente till fot (Savonia Fifth Man Foot Regiment)
 Tavastehus, Viborgs och Nyslotts läns tremänningsregemente till fot'' (Tavastia, Viborg and Nyslott County Third Man Foot Regiment)

By unit 

I 1    - Svea livgarde (1521–1808, 1809–2000)
LG     - Livgardet (2000– )
I 2    - Göta livgarde (1894–1939)
I 2    - Värmlands regemente (1939–2000)
I 3    - Livregementet till fot (1893–1904)
I 3    - Livregementets grenadjärer (1904–2000)
I 4    - Första livgrenadjärregementet (1816–1927)
I 4    - Livgrenadjärregementet (1928–1998)
I 5    - Andra livgrenadjärregementet (1816–1927)
I 5    - Jämtlands fältjägarregemente (1820–1853, 1892–2005)
I 6    - Västgöta regemente (1811–1927)
I 6    - Norra skånska infanteriregementet (1811–1963)
I 7    - Karlskrona grenadjärregemente (1902–1927)
I 7    - Södra skånska infanteriregementet (1811–1963)
I 9    - Skaraborgs regemente (1624–1942)
I 10   - Södermanlands regemente (1634–1942, 1957–1963)
I 11   - Kronobergs regemente (1623–1997)
I 12   - Jönköpings regemente (1623–1927)
I 12   - Jönköpings-Kalmar regemente (1928–1948)
I 12   - Norra Smålands regemente (1948–1994)
I 12   - Smålands regemente (1994–2000)
I 13   - Dalregementet (1617–2000)
I 14   - Hälsinge regemente (1617–1993(1997*))
I 15   - Älvsborgs regemente (1624–1998)
I 16   - Västgöta-Dals regemente (1624–1902)
I 16   - Hallands regemente (1902–2000)
I 17   - Bohusläns regemente (1661–1992)
I 18   - Västmanlands regemente (1628–1927)
I 18   - Gotlands infanterikår (1928–1936)
I 18   - Gotlands infanteriregemente (1936–1963) 
I 19   - Norrbottens regemente (1892–1975, 1994– )
I 20   - Kalmar regemente (1623–1892)
I 20   - Västerbottens regemente (1624–2000)
I 21   - Kalmar regemente (1892–1927)
I 21   - Närkes regemente (1812–1893)
I 21   - Västernorrlands regemente (1928–2000)
I 22   - Värmlands regemente (1812–1939)
I 22   - Lapplands jägarregemente (1945–2000)
I 23   - Jämtlands fältjägarregemente (1820–1853, 1892–1927)
I 24   - Norra skånska infanteriregementet (1811–1928)
I 25   - Södra skånska infanteriregementet (1811–1928)
I 26   - Vaxholms grenadjärregemente (1902–1928)
I 27   - Gotlands infanteriregemente (1887–1927)
I 28   - Västernorrlands regemente (1902–1927)
I 29   - Västernorrlands regemente (1893–1902)
I 30   - Blekinge bataljon (1886–1902)
I 34   - Södra skånska infanteriregementet (1811–1928)

By name 

Adlerkreutz regemente 
af Paléns värvade regemente 
Andra gardesregementet 
Andra livgardet 
Andra livgrenadjärregementet      - I 5
Arméns jägarskola                 - JS
Blekinge bataljon                 - I 30
Bohusläns regemente               - I 17
Dalregementet                     - I 13
Finska gardesregementet
Fleetwoodska regementet 
Första livgrenadjärregementet     - I 4
Garnisonsregementet i Göteborg 
Gotlands infanterikår             - I 18 
Gotlands infanteriregemente       - I 27
Gotlands nationalbeväring  
Gotlands regemente                - I 18
Göta livgarde                     - I 2
Hallands bataljon                 - I 28
Hallands regemente                - I 16
Hälsinge regemente                - I 14
Jägerhornska regementet 
Jämtlands dragonregemente 
Jämtlands fältjägarkår
Jämtlands fältjägarregemente      - I 23, I 5
Jämtlands infanteriregemente
Jämtlands regemente till fot 
Jönköpings regemente              - I 12
Jönköpings-Kalmar regemente      - I 12
Kalmar regemente                  - I 20, I 21
Karlskrona grenadjärregemente     - I 7
Kronobergs regemente              - I 11
Lapplands jägarregemente          - I 22
Livgardet                         - LG
Livgrenadjärregementet            - I 4
Livregementet till fot            - I 3
Livregementets grenadjärer        - I 3
Livregementets grenadjärkår 
Livregementets grenadjärer        - I 3
Norra Smålands regemente          - I 12
Norra skånska infanteriregementet - I 24, I 6
Norrbottens fältjägarkår
Norrbottens regemente             - I 19
Närke regemente                   - I 21
Närke-Värmlands regemente         
Skaraborgs regemente              - I 9
Smålands dragonregementes infanteribataljon
Smålands grenadjärkår             - I 7
Smålands regemente                - I 12
Svea livgarde                     - I 1
Svenska gardesregementet
Södermanlands regemente           - I 10
Södra skånska infanteriregementet - I 34, I 25, I 7 
Upplands regemente                - I 8
Vaxholms grenadjärregemente       - I 26
Värmlands fotjägarbataljon 
Värmlands fältjägarkår            - I 26
Värmlands fältjägarregemente 
Värmlands regemente               - I 22, I 2
Västerbottens fältjägarkår
Västerbottens fältjägarregemente
Västerbottens regemente           - I 19, I 20
Västernorrlands bataljon 
Västernorrlands beväringsbataljon 
Västernorrlands regemente         - I 29, I 28, I 21
Västgöta regemente                - I 6
Västgöta-Dals regemente           - I 16 
Västmanlands regemente            - I 18
Ångermanlands, Medelpads och Jämtlands regemente 
Älvsborgs regemente               - I 15
Änkedrottningens livregemente  
Östgöta infanteriregemente

 
infantry